El Baquiné de Angelitos Negros is a dark eclectic (in the tradition of' Filles de Kilimanjaro) concept album by Willie Colón. It's the soundtrack for a tv special of the same name produced by Latino Broadcasting Service that aired on New York PBS affiliate WNET.

Track listing
 "Angustia Maternal" - 4:00
 "Camino al Barrio" - 3:34
 "Son Guajira del Encuentro" - 4:00
 "Angelitos Negros Part I" - 0:59
 "Cuatro por Tres (El Sueño de Juana)" - 1:11
 "Acuérdate" - 1:50
 "Angelitos Negros Part II" - 0:41
 "Para Los Viejitos" - 7:21
 "Apartamento 21" - 2:44
 "8th Avenue (In the Park)" - 2:49
 "El Baquine" - 2:45
 "8th Avenue (El Fin)"	 - 1:21  
written, arranged and produced  by Willie Colón

Personnel
Ernie Agosto: bongos
Sanford Allen: violin
Andres Eloy Blanco: Spanish vocals
Milton Cardona: conga, soloist
Jose Cigno: drums
Selwart Clarke: cello
Willie Colón: trombone, arranger, director, producer
Alfredo de la Fe: violin
Gene Golden: percussion, conga, soloist
Andy González: bass
Rodgers Grant: piano
Lewis Kahn:	 trombone
Kathryn Kienke: violin
Gloria Lanzarone: cello
Tom "Bones" Malone:	 synthesizer
Jose Mangual Jr.:	 bongos, soloist
Eddy Martinez: piano
Yoko Matsuo: violin
Kermit Moore: violin
Alphonse Mouzon: drums
Thomas Muriel: liner notes
Raymond Orchart: percussion
Victor Paz: trumpet, soloist
Bobby Porcelli: flute, sax (alto), soloist
Edward Rivera: bass (electric)
Mario Rivera: sax (baritone)
Barry Rogers: trombone, soloist
Louis Romero: timbales, soloist
Marty Sheller: conductor
Mauricio Smith: flute, piccolo, soloist
Yomo Toro: guitar, cuatro

External links
El Baquine de Angelitos Negros at Fania Records

1977 albums
Willie Colón albums
Albums produced by Willie Colón